Church of Saint Demetrius or St. Demetrius' Church may refer to:

Albania
 St. Demetrius' Church, Bezmisht
 St. Demetrius' Church, Boboshticë
 St. Demetrius' Church, Drobonik
 St. Demetrius' Church, Poliçan
 St. Demetrius' Monastery Church, Qeparo

Bulgaria
 Church of St Demetrius, Boboshevo
 Church of St Demetrius, Patalenitsa
 Church of St Demetrius of Thessaloniki, Veliko Tarnovo

Romania
 Cathedral of Saint Demetrius, Craiova
 Saint Demetrius Church, Focșani

Others
 Hagios Demetrios, a World Heritage Site in Thessaloniki, Greece
 Church of Saint Demetrius, Budapest, Hungary
 Church of Saint Demetrius in Kosovska Mitrovica, Kosovo
 St Demetrius Chapel, Għarb, Malta
 Cathedral of Saint Demetrius, Vladimir, Russia
 Cathedral Church of St Andrew and St Demetrius, Madrid, Spain
 St. Demetrios Greek Orthodox Church (Seattle), United States